Chris McGrail (born 5 May 1989) is an English former footballer.

Chris currently works for the professional football club Blackburn Rovers as Football Development Manager. 

Chris McGrail is currently engaged to Jade Elliott who is believed to also play football, having previously made appearances in the FA Womens Premier League, the Women’s FA Cup and spending her youth at Blackburn Rovers Girls Academy.

External links
Chris McGrail player profile at pnefc.net

1988 births
Accrington Stanley F.C. players
English footballers
Living people
Footballers from Preston, Lancashire
Preston North End F.C. players
Association football midfielders